Carelis is a genus of moths of the family Noctuidae.

Species
 Carelis albula Bowden, 1956
 Carelis ochrivirga (Prout, 1927)

References
 Carelis at Markku Savela's Lepidoptera and Some Other Life Forms
 Natural History Museum Lepidoptera genus database

Hadeninae